Betty (c. 1738 – 1795) was a biracial enslaved woman owned by Martha Washington. She was owned by the Custis Estate and worked at Daniel Parke Custis' plantation, the White House, on the Pamunkey River in New Kent County, Virginia. Custis married Martha Dandridge (later Martha Washington) in 1750 and, when he died in 1757, Betty became one of Martha's dower slaves whom she brought to George Washington's plantation, Mount Vernon, after the Washington marriage in 1759. Betty worked at Mount Vernon until she died.

Betty was the mother of Ona Judge, who escaped from the Washingtons. Betty worked as a seamstress both at the White House and Mount Vernon plantations. Her story exemplifies the sexual vulnerability that enslaved women faced.

Early life 
Betty was of mixed European and African heritage. Since Betty was born enslaved, her mother would have been of African descent as slavery was inherited through the mother per the law of partus sequitur ventrem. As Betty's mother had a child with a white man, her mother was most likely a slave in the domestic sphere, as that occupation would have caused Betty's mother to be in close proximity to white men.

Betty was born circa 1738 and spent her childhood cared for by someone besides her mother as enslaved parents worked sunup to sundown and only had time with their children at night. Enslaved children younger than twelve did not work with their parents and did not yet have specified occupations. Instead, their owners had them do chores, like collecting water and firewood, or taking care of younger enslaved children. Because enslaved children did not typically work as long as adults, they did not receive shoes or blankets, and were often forced to share blankets with their family members. Enslaved children were also given less than the normal food ration and often helped to grow gardens so their family could have more food than just the meager rations they were provided.

As with many other slaves, Betty likely only had one set of clothes for the whole year. Children like Betty were given shifts to wear.

Life at the Custis Plantation 
By the time she was a pre-adolescent, around 11–14 years old, Betty trained to be a seamstress, a skilled occupation that gave her a higher status among the enslaved workforce at the White House. Betty started work before sunrise and ended work after the sun went down. Slaves working in the domestic sphere, like seamstresses, were often biracial.

As a seamstress, Betty was not only tasked with making clothes for her master and his family, but also for other enslaved people on the plantation. The master and his families' clothes would have been made with materials like silk, cotton, or anything that the master could afford, while slaves' clothes tended to be made from linen or wool, which were much cheaper materials. Betty would also have been tasked with repairing clothes of both the enslaved people and her master and his family.

As an enslaved domestic worker, Betty worked closely with Martha Custis (Washington) both at the White House plantation and at Mount Vernon. Betty was one of Martha's favorite slaves and while working at the White House, "Betty watched... [Martha Washington] survive the sudden loss of her first husband" and two of her four children. She also saw her meet and marry George Washington.

While working at the Custis plantation, Betty gave birth to her first child, Austin, at the age of nineteen in 1757. Austin's father is unknown, but it is likely that his father was white as Austin was reported to have lighter skin. Since lighter skin was favored for domestic occupations, Austin worked as a waiter for the Washingtons.

Move to Mount Vernon 
Daniel Parke Custis died in 1757, leaving Martha Custis a very rich widow. As part of Martha's widow dower share she received 84 slaves from the Custis estate. Scholar Erica Dunbar notes that the death of an owner would have made 21-year-old Betty nervous, as slaves were often sold and families separated in order to pay off any outstanding debts their owner may have had. Luckily for Betty, she and her two-year-old son, Austin, were not separated and Martha Washington picked both of them to go to Mount Vernon with her in 1759. At the time of Betty's and Austin's move to Mount Vernon, together the two of them were worth sixty pounds. Eventually a total of 155 slaves from the Custis estate were brought to Mount Vernon. Dunbar notes that Betty's anxieties would not have subsided with her move to the new Virginia plantation, as she was likely nervous about the sexual vulnerability she faced with her new owner. Dunbar writes that at 21, Betty was the perfect age for childbearing, and she did not know how Washington would treat her. It was never recorded that George Washington sexually abused any of his slaves, but Betty was still vulnerable to exploitation by other men at Mount Vernon, as well as at the White House plantation.

Life at Mount Vernon 

At Mount Vernon, Betty was part of the 6% mixed race (of mixed European and African descent) population at the plantation. Betty spent her entire day working primarily as a seamstress and spinner, but she also cooked and cleaned. Since Betty worked at the Mansion House, the domestic part of the estate, she was likely to be seen by visitors and so she was clothed better than her enslaved field working counterparts. Betty wore simple, ankle-length dresses that were made out of cheaper material, like linen or wool. Betty also had an apron, cap, stockings, and shoes.

As a seamstress, like at the White House plantation, Betty was tasked with making clothes for her owners as well as for other slaves. She would make clothing for enslaved individuals, mostly out of linen and wool, according to the clothing ration Washington allocated for his enslaved people. Each week, Betty had to make a certain percentage of clothes or she would have been punished.

During her time at Mount Vernon, it is not exactly clear where Betty lived. She possibly lived in a log cabin or in a brick building, called the "House of Families," which was the predominant slave quarter at the Mansion House. Domestic slaves were kept close to the Washingtons' home and Betty's possible living space was only 300 feet away. Only skilled, domestic slaves lived at the "House of Families," and it was located on "the north lane of outbuildings, directly across from the blacksmiths' shop." It was two stories tall and had chimneys. From archaeological evidence, it appears that slaves living at the "House of Families" cooked "one-pot meals" that consisted of low-grade meat and cornmeal, as well as any vegetables or fruits that they had grown in their gardens. Washington only provided his enslaved people rations of pork and cornmeal.

In 1792–1793, the "House of Families" was destroyed. It was replaced with one-story quarters built next to where the "House of Families" used to be. These new quarters were 2,800 square feet and held sixty people in four rooms. Each room had one fireplace, one door, and some kind of bunk beds. Washington built these new quarters so that he could keep a closer eye on his enslaved people.

The housing situation at Mount Vernon reveals a hierarchy, as slaves were housed according to their occupation. Skilled slaves tended to be housed in brick buildings at the Mansion House, while field workers were instead housed in log or wood cabins at the different farms in which they worked. Mount Vernon consisted of five farms.

While at Mount Vernon, Betty had four more children: Tom Davis (born 1769), Betty Davis (born 1771), Ona Judge (born 1774 and died 1848), and Philadelphia (born 1780 and died 1831). Tom and Betty were the children of Thomas Davis, a white man who worked at Mount Vernon as a weaver. Ona Judge was the daughter of Andrew Judge who was from England. Philadelphia's father is unknown, but in 1807 she was freed from slavery and married William Costin, an abolitionist and free man, who was the son of an enslaved woman, Ann Dandridge, and whose father was John Dandridge, the father of Martha Dandridge Custis Washington.

While Betty had five children total, as a slave she would have been separated from her children for most of the day. Betty also had "little control... over the lives of...[her] children." Austin and Ona were selected by George and Martha Washington to accompany them to New York and Philadelphia after Washington was elected President. There was nothing Betty could do about this, and her children were forced to be separated from her because they were Martha Washington's property and she could do whatever she wanted with them. Every child Betty had enriched the Washingtons' and the Custis Estate, as children and young adults provided more enslaved labor. The number of children that Betty had and the varying white fathers may illustrate the sexual vulnerability that enslaved women faced, especially when they worked in the domestic sphere, which put them in close proximity to many white men, not just their owner. (See, for example, the biographies of Alice Clifton, Jane the Runaway, Bridge Town, and Winney Grimshaw.)

Relationship with Andrew Judge 
Andrew Judge, the father of Betty's daughter, Ona, came to the colonies in 1772 from England as an indentured servant. Washington bought Judge's labor, and Judge worked as a tailor at Mount Vernon. Betty was around 34 years old when Judge arrived at Mount Vernon and she likely met him due to the work that they both did with textiles and tailoring. Judge eventually worked off his indentured servitude and left Mount Vernon in the 1780s. We do not know if their relationship was consensual.

Later life and death 

While her children Austin and Ona were working in Philadelphia, Betty labored at Mount Vernon. She became a grandmother to eighteen grandchildren. However, tragedy struck in 1794 when her son, Austin, drowned while traveling back to Virginia from Philadelphia. Erica Dunbar states that this "news was too much for Austin's mother [Betty] to bear." Betty at this point was fatigued by her lifelong work as a slave and had been sick. She eventually died at Mount Vernon in 1795, around 57 years old. Of her death George Washington said "It is happy for old Betty, and her children and friends, that she is taken of[f] the stage; her life must have been miserable to herself, and troublesome to all those around her."

Betty never escaped the bonds of slavery and labored at the White House plantation and Mount Vernon for her entire life. However, two of her daughters, Ona Judge Staines and Philadelphia Costin, did escape their bonds and lived out their lives as free women of color.

References

Bibliography  
 
 

 
 
 
 

Mount Vernon slaves
George Washington
1795 deaths
18th-century African-American women